Faith Brook (16 February 1922 – 11 March 2012) was an English actress who appeared on stage, in films and on television, generally in upper-class roles. She was the daughter of actor Clive Brook.

Early years 
Although she was born in York, England, she was raised in Hollywood. Her father was the actor Clive Brook, and her brother Lyndon Brook was also an actor.

Brook was educated in Los Angeles, London and Gstaad, Switzerland. As a teenager, she studied at the Royal Academy of Dramatic Art.

Film 
Brook's screen debut came via a bit part in Suspicion (1941). Her first credited film appearance was The Jungle Book in 1942.  The Encyclopedia of British Film described her as being cast "almost invariably in well-bred roles ..."

Stage 
In September 1941, Brook debuted on stage in Lottie Dundass in Santa Barbara.

During World War II, Brook served in Britain's Auxiliary Territorial Service.  Following that, she acted in the Bristol Old Vic.  Later, in London, she joined the company of The Old Vic.

She also appeared on stage in The Colour of Poppies and in Uncle Vanya in 2008.

Her Broadway credits include The Cocktail Party (1949), You Never Can Tell (1947), and Letters to Lucerne (1941).

Television 
Brook portrayed Julia Naughton in the American television series Claudia (1952). In Britain, she appeared on War and Peace (1972) on the BBC and The Irish RM on Channel 4, among other programmes.

Personal life
Brook was married twice, first to Charles Moffett and then later to Michael Horowitz.  Brook and her second husband had a son, Stephen B. Horowitz (British birth records)/>

She was a supporter of the British Humanist Association.

Selected filmography
 

 Suspicion (1941) - Alice Barham (uncredited)
 Jungle Book (1942) - English Girl
 No Time for Love (1943) - Pert Brunette (uncredited)
 Uneasy Terms (1948) - Viola Alardyse
 Wicked as They Come (1956) - Virginia Collins
 The Intimate Stranger (1956) - Lesley Wilson
 Across the Bridge (1957) - Kay
 Man in the Shadow (1957) - Joan Lennox
 Chase a Crooked Shadow (1958) - Elaine Whitman
 The 39 Steps (1959) - Nannie
 We Shall See (1964) - Alva Collins
 The Heroes of Telemark (1965) - Woman on Bus
 To Sir, with Love (1967) - Grace Evans
 Adelaide (1968) - Dickson
 The Smashing Bird I Used to Know (1969) - Dr. Sands
 Walk a Crooked Path (1969) - Elizabeth Hemming
 War and Peace (1972, BBC TV) - Countess Rostova
 North Sea Hijack (1980) - Prime Minister
 Bloodbath (1979) - Heather
 The Curse of King Tut's Tomb (1980) - Lady Almina Carnarvon
 The Sea Wolves (1980) - Mrs. Grice
 Eye of the Needle (1981) - Lucy's Mother
 The Razor's Edge (1984) - Louisa Bradley (Isabel's Mother)
 Miss Beatty's Children (1992) - Mabel Forster
 Mrs Dalloway (1997) - Lady Bexborough
 AKA (2002) - Contessa de la Reche

Selected television credits

Selected radio 
 The Reluctant Peer by William Douglas-Home broadcast on BBC (1967)

References

External links

 Selected performances in Theatre Archive University of Bristol

1922 births
2012 deaths
English film actresses
English humanists
English stage actresses
English television actresses
Actresses from York
Alumni of RADA